Tajura wa Arba was one of the districts of Libya from 2001 to 2007.  It consisted of eleven Basic People's Congresses, similar to townships, and its capital was Tajura.  In the 2007 administrative reorganization the territory formerly in Tajura Wa Al Nawahi Al Arba was transferred to the Tripoli District (Tarabulus District).

In the north, Tajura wa Arba had a shoreline on the Mediterranean Sea.  On land, it bordered the following districts:
Murqub (المرقب) - to the east
Tarhuna wa Msalata (ترهونه و مسلته) - to the south
Tripoli (طربلس) - to the west

Notes

 

Former districts of Libya